Stok is a village and museum in northern India.

Stok may also refer to:

Places
Stok, Kuyavian-Pomeranian Voivodeship (north-central Poland)
Stok, Podlaskie Voivodeship (north-east Poland)
Stok, Łódź Voivodeship (central Poland)
Stok, Puławy County in Lublin Voivodeship (east Poland)
Stok, Radzyń Podlaski County in Lublin Voivodeship (east Poland)
Stok, Masovian Voivodeship (east-central Poland)
Stok, Lubusz Voivodeship (west Poland)

People with the surname
Barbara Stok (born 1970), Dutch cartoonist

See also
Stock (disambiguation)